Cartoon Network is the Italian version of the U.S. television channel, available on Sky Italia and UPC Switzerland. It is owned by Warner Bros. Discovery under its International division, and primarily airs animated series. The channel was originally launched as part of the larger pan-European feed back in September 1993.

History 
Cartoon Network Italian feed started broadcasting on 31 July 1996 on the Italian satellite pay TV platform TELE+ Digitale, and it later began available also on Stream TV's cable and satellite bouquet.

On 31 July 2003 it became exclusively available on Sky Italia, born after the two previous pay TV providers merger.
On this day, the +1 timeshift channel started broadcasting.

On 13 September 2006 the channel rebranded to the Wave era along with a new logo.

On 8 December 2008 the channel became available on Mediaset Premium.

The channel rebranded again on 29 November 2010 to the CHECK it. era, with the new slogan Ce N'è..

On 28 November 2016 an HD feed began transmitting exclusively on Sky Italia.

On 1 June 2018 the channel closed on Mediaset Premium.

On 1 May 2020 the channel became available on Now, replacing Disney Channel following its closedown.

On 15 December 2020 Cartoon Network SD feed closed, becoming thus only available in HD. However, its +1 timeshift channel is still only available in SD.

Logos

Cartoon Network +1 
Cartoon Network +1 is a 1 hour timeshift channel of Cartoon Network launched on 31 July 2003, used also as a channel to air temporary special programmings.

From 4 to 12 February 2017 Cartoon Network +1, along with the British version, became Cartoon Network Lego Days, airing only LEGO series and movies. This schedule got repeated from 27 October to 4 November 2018 and from 18 to 27 October 2019.

From 4 to 14 March 2021 the channel became a We Bare Bears channel, airing only We Bare Bears.

Current schedule

Series currently on schedule 
 Be Cool, Scooby-Doo!
 Craig of the Creek
 DC Super Hero Girls
 Jellystone!
 Looney Tunes Cartoons
 Power Players
 Robotboy (only on night)
 Teen Titans Go!
 The Amazing World of Gumball
 The Looney Tunes Show
 We Baby Bears

Series formerly on schedule 
 Adventure Time
 Apple & Onion
 Ben 10
 Bionic Max
 Lego Ninjago
 Steven Universe
 The Fungies!
 Victor and Valentino
 We Bare Bears

References

External links
www.CartoonNetwork.it (Official Website) 

Children's television networks
Cartoon Network
Television channels in Italy
Television stations in Switzerland
Italian-language television stations
Television channels and stations established in 1996
Turner Broadcasting System Italy
Warner Bros. Discovery EMEA

tr:Cartoon Network#İtalya